One Temporary Escape  is a live video album from New Zealand post-punk revival band The Naked and Famous, recorded on 21 April 2012 at The Warfield in San Francisco, California. It was directed by Jordan Blady, produced by Aaron Short, Jordan Blady and Thom Powers, and executive produced by The Naked and Famous. The video was released on 18 March 2013 as a free download, to thank fans for their support.

Premise 
The video was created following a constant two-year tour for Passive Me, Aggressive You. Thom Powers, guitarist and vocalist for the ensemble, stated that because large outdoor performances and television concerts often end up on the internet, the best thing to do was to record their own live album and provide it to fans to show gratitude, stating that One Temporary Escape is likely the best presentation of the band's live performance.

Track listing

Personnel 
 Aaron Short — keyboard
 Alisa Xayalith — lead vocals, keyboard
 David Beadle — bass
 Jesse Wood — drums
 Thom Powers — vocals, guitar

Trivia 
On April 21, 2012 (when One Temporary Escape was recorded), Now, Now and The Vacationers performed as opening acts for The Naked and Famous.

References 

2013 live albums
2013 video albums
Live pop albums
Live punk revival albums
The Naked and Famous albums